Andrew Dewhurst (born 24 September 1983) is a cricketer who plays for Jersey. He played in the 2013 ICC World Cricket League Division Six tournament.

References

External links
 

1983 births
Living people
Jersey cricketers
Place of birth missing (living people)